Hull-Wright (District 7) is a municipal district in the city of Gatineau, Quebec. From 2001 to 2009 it was known as Hull District and from 2009 to 2013 as Hull–Val-Tétreau. It is represented on Gatineau City Council by Steve Moran of Action Gatineau.

The district is located in the Hull sector of the city. It includes all of Downtown Hull plus part of the neighbourhood of Wrightville.

From 2009 to 2013, it also included Val-Tétreau, Jardins Mackenzie-King and Jardins Alexandre-Taché.

Prior to the 2009 election, the district did not include Val-Tétreau, or Jardins Alexandre-Taché, and only the eastern half of Jardins Mackenzie-King. The district also included the southern end of Wrightville, south of Rue St-Jean-Bosco. The added parts came from Val-Tétreau District, which was abolished. Despite the name being added, only a small part of Val-Tétreau joined Hull.

Councillors
Denise Laferrière (2001–2017)
Cédric Tessier, Action Gatineau (2017-2021)
Steve Moran, Action Gatineau (2021–present)

Election results

2001

2005

2009

2013

2017

2021

References

Districts of Gatineau